Alpha Kappa Lambda, commonly known as AKL or Alpha Kapp, is an American collegiate social fraternity founded at the University of California, Berkeley, in 1914. Today, it operates approximately 30 active chapters and has approximately 28,000 living initiated members.

History and tradition
Alpha Kappa Lambda was founded under that name on April 22, 1914, by a group of young men attending the University of California, Berkeley. Its birth, however, dates back to 1906 when a group of friends, the Los Amigos Club, discussed the "need of Christian men for a place to live and study that was within their [financial] means." These eleven men, celebrated as the Fraternity's founders, were:

After assisting in the cleanup of the 1906 San Francisco earthquake, four of the group re-addressed their desire to organize a house club during a YMCA conference in Pacific Grove, California. Shortly after, seven more men joined Los Amigos. Reverend Gail Cleland, one of the original eleven members of Los Amigos, recalled, "when we organized Los Amigos as a house club...house clubs and fraternities were a dime-a-dozen. They came, they lived for a few months or a few years, then they went out of existence again. But Los Amigos did not go out of existence."    The Club adopted its Greek letter name of Alpha Kappa Lambda on April 22, 1914, and, contemplating an early expansion program, adjusted its operational model into a more permanent fraternal association model. Immediate growth beyond the University of California was precluded by the nation's entry into WWI; however, upon return, active members and alumni revised their attention to expansion, with establishment of the Beta chapter at Stanford, followed by several Midwestern universities.

The Great Depression and WWII disrupted the geographic progression of the Fraternity until 1949 when it hired its first full-time employee. Expansion resumed with an aggressive plan in 1950.

The Fraternity is a member of the NIC, having joined in 1930, and becoming a senior member in 1954.

Alpha Kappa Lambda is a non-secret order, there being no pledges of secrecy in the ritual, nor any grips, passwords, or other clandestine signs.  Reliance upon honor and the "members' finer feelings [are] depended upon" to safeguard the ritual and meaning of the fraternity.

The Fraternity has eliminated "Hell Week", personal duties by pledges, and hazing.

Fraternity motto 
The motto of the fraternity is Alethia Kai Logos that in Classical Greek means "The Truth and the Word", with the words' initials in the same language forming the fraternity's name.

Fraternity badge
The official badge of the fraternity is made of ten carat gold. An  and a  rest in the background, covered with the flowers of a dogwood, representing Christian principles, and a  that is raised, set with eleven whole pearls. The pearls represent the eleven founders of the Los Amigos Club.  The badge is to be worn only on collared shirts, sweaters, or suit vests, and in the traditional position over the heart. It may only be worn by initiated members of the fraternity.

National service projects

These Hands Don't Hurt 
Alpha Kappa Lambda realized that sexual assault is a serious problem on college campuses and believes that it can be fought through education, service, and philanthropic projects. The philanthropic fundraising aspect is the most visible of the three. The fundraising is performed via a "Promise Wall" displayed prominently in a high traffic area of campus. Students, faculty, and members of the community are asked to add their "hand" to the Promise Wall for a contribution of $1. By placing their "hand" on the wall they make a promise that their hand will not be used to harm others. These Hands Don't Hurt was started in ΑΚΛ by the Beta Zeta chapter (East Tennessee State University) in 1996. In the spirit of "growing the movement" Alpha Kappa Lambda has allowed other student organizations from around the country to use the program as a way to raise awareness about domestic violence.

Cystic Fibrosis
The fraternity adopted cystic fibrosis as a national philanthropy at the 1990 National Conclave. Chapters support the fight against cystic fibrosis in many ways. chapter fundraisers provide financial support to local organizations, research, and individuals. chapters provide manpower to help local organizations' events. Members can have holiday or birthday parties for children suffering from CF. There are countless ways to touch the lives of CF sufferers and their families.

Adopt-A-School
The Adopt-A-School program was endorsed by the National Executive Council during their 1994 Winter meeting. The goal of the program is to provide for the formation of one-on-one relationships between local college students and local elementary students. This program provides an opportunity for college students to give something back to their host communities while devoting time and energy to being a role model for children.

Chapters

Notable alumni

Bishop James Chamberlain Baker, Gamma chapter, educator, pastor, and the organizer and head of the first Wesley Foundation in the US, at the University of Illinois
Joe Coulombe, Stanford University, Beta chapter, founder and CEO of Trader Joe's
Allen Drury, Stanford University, Beta chapter, journalist, Pulitzer Prize winner 
Tim Leavitt, Eta chapter, Mayor of Vancouver, Washington
Rian Lindell, Washington State University, Eta chapter, NFL player, Buffalo Bills (current PE teacher at Eastlake High School)
Jason Kurle, Washington State University, Eta chapter, Surgeon (Detroit, MI), pioneer of Kurle-Kaushik Maneuver  
Carl Rogers, University of Wisconsin–Madison, Epsilon chapter, psychologist
Eric Schmitt, Truman State University, Xi chapter, Former Missouri Attorney General. Current US Senator
John Laurence Seymour, University of California Berkeley, Alpha chapter, composer and playwright
General Oliver Prince Smith, University of California Berkeley, Alpha chapter, Korean War hero

See also
List of social fraternities and sororities

References

External links
 Alpha Kappa Lambda Fraternity

Student societies in the United States
North American Interfraternity Conference
University of California, Berkeley
Student organizations established in 1914
Fraternities and sororities based in Indianapolis
1914 establishments in California